Ahmed Aït El-Hocine (born 12 February 1957) is an Algerian footballer. He played in six matches for the Algeria national football team in 1981 and 1982. He was also named in Algeria's squad for the 1982 African Cup of Nations tournament.

Titles

As a coach 
USM Alger
Algerian Cup: 1999

References

External links
 

1957 births
Living people
Algerian footballers
Algeria international footballers
1982 African Cup of Nations players
Place of birth missing (living people)
Association footballers not categorized by position
21st-century Algerian people